Colonel General Ivan Vasylyovych Bizhan (born on 25 December 1941 in Yalanets, Tomashpil Raion Transnistria Governorate, Kingdom of Romania) was a Ukrainian military officer who served for short period (4th-8th October 1993) as acting Minister of Defence.

Bizhan has taken one of the most active roles in reestablishing of the Ukrainian Armed Forces in the beginning of 1990s. On 7 April 1992, he was member of Ukrainian delegation to Sevastopol led by the First Deputy Chairman of Verkhovna Rada Vasyl Durdynets and left for Sevastopol for official ceremony of presenting a commander of the revived Ukrainian Navy, rear admiral Borys Kozhyn and accept the oath of allegiance of sailors who decided to join Ukrainian Navy. In June 1993, Bizhan also was a member of Ukrainian delegation in negotiations with the Russian Federation over the future 1997 friendship treaty.

References

External links 
 Neshchadym, M. Ivan Bizhan. Encyclopedia of Modern Ukraine.

1941 births
Living people
People from Vinnytsia Oblast
Colonel Generals of Ukraine
Defence ministers of Ukraine
Military Academy of the General Staff of the Armed Forces of the Soviet Union alumni
Recipients of the Order of Bohdan Khmelnytsky, 2nd class
Recipients of the Order of Bohdan Khmelnytsky, 3rd class